Growling is a low, guttural vocalization produced by predatory animals; producing growls.

Growling or growl may also refer to:

Sounds
 Death growl, the dominant singing style in death metal music
 Stomach growl, or borborygmus, noise produced by movement of the contents of the gastro-intestinal tract
 Growling (wind instruments) a wind instrument (for example, saxophone) technique

Other uses
 Growl (software), a global notifications system for Mac OS X and Microsoft Windows
 Growl (video game), a 1990 arcade game
 Growl (album), a 2008 album by Radioactive Man
 "Growl" (song), a 2013 song by South Korean–Chinese boy band Exo
 "Growl", song by Johnny Kidd And The Pirates 1959

See also

 Growler (disambiguation)